Zeev Ben-Zvi (1904–1952) was an Israeli sculptor born in Ryki, Poland, whose work influenced a generation of sculptors.

Biography
Zeev Ben-Zvi studied at Academy of Fine Art in Warsaw. In 1923, he immigrated to Mandatory Palestine, where he studied at the Bezalel School of Art in Jerusalem from 1923 to 1924.

When the New Bezalel School opened, he taught sculpture there from 1926 to 1927. In 1937, he travelled to Paris and then to London from 1937 to 1938.

He specialized in portrait heads in beaten copper and mounded plaster, which he treated in a cubist manner. In 1947, he created  the monument "In Memory of the Children of the Diaspora" in Mishmar Haemek.

Awards and recognition
 In 1953, Ben Zvi received the Dizengoff Prize for Sculpture.
 Also in 1953, he was awarded the Israel Prize, for sculpture, being the inaugural year of the prize, and was accordingly the first artist to be awarded this honor.

See also
 List of Israel Prize recipients
 List of Polish Jews
 Ben-Zvi

Further reading
 Newman, Elias, Art in Palestine, Siebel Company, publishers, New York 1939
 Gamzu, H., Ben-Zvi, Sculptures, 1955

References

External links 

Bezalel Academy of Arts and Design alumni
Academic staff of Bezalel Academy of Arts and Design
Israel Prize in sculpture recipients
Israeli sculptors
Modern sculptors
Jewish sculptors
Polish emigrants to Mandatory Palestine
People from Ryki
Jews in Mandatory Palestine
Jewish Israeli artists
1904 births
1952 deaths
Academy of Fine Arts in Warsaw alumni
20th-century Polish sculptors
Polish male sculptors
20th-century Israeli male artists